Sault Ste. Marie Municipal Airport , also known as Sanderson Field, is a city-owned, public-use airport located one nautical mile (1.85 km) southwest of the central business district of Sault Ste. Marie, a city in Chippewa County, Michigan, United States.

Although most U.S. airports use the same three-letter location identifier for the FAA and IATA, this airport is assigned ANJ by the FAA but has no designation from the IATA (which assigned ANJ to Zanaga Airport in Zanaga, Republic of Congo).

Facilities and aircraft 
Sault Ste. It has one runway designated 14/32 with an asphalt surface measuring 5,234 by 100 feet (1,595 x 30 m).

For the twelve-month period ending December 31, 2015, the airport had 9,067 general aviation aircraft operations, an average of 25 per day. In January 2017, there were 16 aircraft based at this airport: 15 single-engine and 1 multi-engine.

References

External links 
 Aerial photo as of 28 April 1998 from USGS The National Map via MSR Maps
 

Airports in Michigan
Buildings and structures in Chippewa County, Michigan
Transportation in Chippewa County, Michigan
Airports in the Upper Peninsula of Michigan